Horney Bluff is a conspicuous ice-free bluff about  long, extending eastward along the north side of Byrd Glacier from Merrick Glacier toward Cape Kerr, Antarctica. It was named by the Advisory Committee on Antarctic Names for Captain Harry R. Horney, Admiral Byrd's chief of staff on U.S. Navy Operation Highjump, 1946–47.

Cornwell Corner is located at the west end of Horney Bluff and the terminus of Merrick Glacier.

References

Cliffs of Oates Land